Crazy Monkey Studios is an independent video game development studio. Founded in 2010 and rebranded into Rogueside in 2020. Crazy Monkey Studios originally had its office in Kontich, Belgium until 2018 after which it relocated to Geel, Belgium.

History

Crazy Monkey Studios was founded in 2010 by Steven Verbeek and Martijn Holtkamp, after they met at a game conference. They teamed up to develop the game 'Empire: The deck building strategy game'. With limited resources, they created Empire and launched it on iOS and Android. In 2014 the team started working on Guns, Gore and Cannoli and launched this game on Steam, Xbox One, PS4 and Nintendo Switch in 2015. After a success release they continued working on a sequel for the game and launched Guns, Gore and Cannoli 2 in 2018 on the same platforms. The Team split up in 2018 and the majority relocated to a new office location in Geel, Belgium for a new start.
They teamed up with Warcave in 2018 to develop the real time strategy game War Party that got released on Steam, Xbox One, PS4, Nintendo Switch in 2019.
In 2020 the company launched the hidden object game named 'Hidden Through Time'.

Games
Empire: The Deck Building Strategy Game (2013, iOS)
Guns, Gore and Cannoli: launch: April 30, 2015 on Steam
Guns, Gore and Cannoli 2
War Party
Hidden Through Time

References

External links
 
 Guns, Gore and Cannoli Official Site

Video game companies established in 2010
Video game companies of Belgium
Video game development companies
Companies based in Antwerp Province
Belgian companies established in 2010
Kontich